The 2005 NCAA Division I women's basketball tournament began on March 19, 2005, and concluded on April 5, 2005, when Baylor was crowned as the new national champion. The Final Four was held for the first (and last) time at the RCA Dome in Indianapolis, Indiana on April 3 and 5, 2005, and was hosted by Butler University and the Horizon League. Future Final Fours will be held every five years in Indianapolis, the NCAA's home city, will be played at Lucas Oil Stadium, one block south of the Indiana Convention Center, where the RCA Dome is located. Baylor, coached by Kim Mulkey-Robertson, defeated Michigan State, coached by Joanne P. McCallie, 84–62 in the championship game. Baylor's Sophia Young was named Most Outstanding Player. For the first time, taking a page from the Men's Tournament, the regionals were named after the city they were played in, rather than the geographical location (East, Mideast, Midwest and West), and the "pod" system adopted by the Men's Tournament was used.

Notable events
In three of the four regions, the number one seed in the  region advanced to the Final Four. In the Chattanooga Regional, 13th seeded Liberty upset both Penn State and DePaul to advance to the regional semifinal, but there encountered the top seed LSU, who won and went on to defeat Duke to advance to the Final Four in Indianapolis.

In the Philadelphia Regional, Tennessee faced Purdue in the second round. The victory represented the 880th win for coach Pat Summitt, moving her beyond Dean Smith 879 career victories, to claim the top spot in college basketball career victories. Rutgers upset Ohio State to advance to the regional final, but top seeded Tennessee won to advance. In the Kansas City Regional, top seeded Michigan State defeated the 2 seed Stanford to advance. The single exception was in the Tempe Regional, where second seeded Baylor upset North Carolina to earn a spot at the Final Four.

In one semifinal, Baylor faced LSU. Five years earlier, Baylor had won just seven games against twenty losses, and had never been to an NCAA Tournament. Then they hired Kim Mulkey, who coached the team to an NCAA berth in her first year, and now was coaching a team in the Final Four. However, thirteen minutes into the game, LSU led 24–9. The two teams had played before, in the opening regular season game for Baylor. In that game the Lady Bears found themselves down by 19 points at halftime. They almost closed the gap, but ended up with a one-point loss. This time, they found themselves down again by a large margin. Mulkey called a timeout, and the team responded with six straight points. Not long after, a three-pointer cut the lead to six, and they continued to chip away, reaching the halftime with the score tied at 28. After the break, LSU retook the lead, and were up by four points with just over eight minutes to play, but would go scoreless for five minutes. Baylor retook the lead, and held on to win 68–57 to advance to the championship game.

In the second semifinal, Tennessee faced Michigan State, who were playing in their first Final Four. The Lady Vols had a six-point lead at halftime, but extended the lead to 16 points with fourteen and a half minutes to go. Although the crowd had watched Baylor recover from a 15-point deficit earlier in the evening, that had occurred with 28 minutes to play. This time, the deficit was 16 and just over 14 minutes left. The Spartans cut into the lead, and with a minute to go had tied the game. At that point Kristin Haynie, who had only scored two points in the game, stole the ball and ran almost the length of the floor to score a layup and take the lead. Tennessee then missed three shots and Michigan State scored the final points of the game to tie the record for  the largest comeback in NCAA Tournament history.

The final matched up two nontraditional names in women's basketball. Michigan State had never before advanced beyond the second round, and Baylor had but once, and was only in their fourth NCAA tournament ever. Baylor opened up a 19-point lead early, but no lead seemed safe after 15 point and 16 point comebacks in the semifinals. The lead ballooned to 23, then Michigan State attempted a comeback, but the Lady Bears were too strong, and went on to win their first National Championship 84–62.

Locations

So as to decrease the number of games played on a competing team's home court, the subregionals were held at eight locations, rather than 16, for the first time. Furthermore, following the lead of the men's tournament in recent years, the 2005 women's tournament used the "pod system", keeping most teams at or close to the home cities, and were held from March 19 to 22 at these locations:
March 19 and 21:
Bank of America Arena at Hec Edmundson Pavilion, Seattle, Washington (Host: University of Washington)
Reunion Arena, Dallas, Texas (Host: University of Texas at Austin and Texas Tech University)
Save Mart Center, Fresno, California (Host: Fresno State University)
Williams Arena, Minneapolis, Minnesota (Host: University of Minnesota, Twin Cities)

March 20 and 22:
Comcast Center, College Park, Maryland (Host: University of Maryland, College Park)
Dean Smith Center, Chapel Hill, North Carolina (Host: University of North Carolina at Chapel Hill)
Harry A. Gampel Pavilion, Storrs, Connecticut (Host: University of Connecticut)
Thompson-Boling Arena, Knoxville, Tennessee (Host: University of Tennessee)

The regionals were held from March 24 to 27 in the following regions. The regionals, for the first time, were named after the city they were played in instead of a direction (East, South, Midwest, West).

March 26 and 28:
Chattanooga Regional, McKenzie Arena, Chattanooga, Tennessee (Host: University of Tennessee at Chattanooga)
Tempe Regional, Wells Fargo Arena, Tempe, Arizona (Host: Arizona State University)

March 27 and 29:
Kansas City Regional, Municipal Auditorium, Kansas City, Missouri (Host: University of Missouri–Kansas City)
Philadelphia Regional, Liacouras Center, Philadelphia, Pennsylvania (Host: Temple University)

The regional winners advanced to the Final Four, held on April 3 and 5, 2005 at the RCA Dome, in Indianapolis, Indiana, hosted by both Butler University and the Horizon League.

Tournament records
 Margin overcome—Michigan State overcame a 16-point deficit, trailing 47–31, with 16:03 remaining, but rallied to beat Tennessee 68–64. The 16 point margin overcome is the largest in an NCAA semifinal game.

Qualifying teams - automatic
Sixty-four teams were selected to participate in the 2005 NCAA Tournament. Thirty-one conferences were eligible for an automatic bid to the 2005 NCAA tournament.

Qualifying teams - at-large
Thirty-three additional teams were selected to complete the sixty-four invitations.

Bids by conference
Thirty-one conferences earned an automatic bid. In twenty-one cases, the automatic bid was the only representative from the conference. Thirty-three additional at-large teams were selected from ten of the conferences.

Bids by state

The sixty-four teams came from thirty-one states, plus Washington, D.C. Texas had the most teams with seven bids. Nineteen states did not have any teams receiving bids.

Brackets
Data source

Chattanooga Regional

Tempe Regional

Philadelphia Regional

Kansas City Regional

Final Four - Indianapolis, Indiana

Record by conference

Nineteen conferences went 0-1: America East, Atlantic Sun Conference
Big Sky Conference, Big West Conference, Colonial, Horizon League, Ivy League, MAAC, MAC,
Summit League, MEAC, Missouri Valley Conference, Northeast Conference,
Ohio Valley Conference, Patriot League, Southern Conference, Southland, SWAC, and West Coast Conference

All-Tournament Team

 Sophia Young, Baylor
 Steffanie Blackmon, Baylor
 Emily Niemann, Baylor
 Lindsay Bowen, Michigan St.
 Kristin Haynie, Michigan St.

Game Officials

 Dee Kantner (semifinal)
 Sally Bell (semifinal)
 Tina Napier (semifinal)
 Barb Smith (semifinal)
 Bob Trammel (semifinal)
 Michael Price (semifinal)
 Lisa Mattingly (final)
 Melissa Barlow (final)
 Scott Yarbrough (final)

See also
 2005 NCAA Division II women's basketball tournament
 2005 NCAA Division III women's basketball tournament
 2005 NAIA Division I women's basketball tournament
 2005 NAIA Division II women's basketball tournament
 2005 NCAA Division I men's basketball tournament

Notes

NCAA Division I women's basketball tournament
NCAA
Tournament
NCAA Division I women's basketball tournament
NCAA Division I women's basketball tournament
Basketball in the Dallas–Fort Worth metroplex